A copybook, or copy book is a book used in education that contains examples of handwriting and blank space for learners to imitate.

Typical uses include teaching penmanship and arithmetic to students.  A page of a copy book typically starts with a copybook heading: a printed example of what should be copied, such as a single letter or a short proverb. The rest of the page is empty, except for horizontal rulings. The student is expected to copy the example down the page. By copying, the student is supposed to practise penmanship, spelling, reading comprehension, punctuation, and vocabulary.

History
The American Instructor: Or, Young Man's Best Companion, published in 1748, was the first American copybook. The 1802 book The Port folio recommends the copybook method of learning fine penmanship over the previously used method of "engraved models", citing the advantage of having the example text closer to the student's reproduction. The author adds, "A neat copybook has often laid the foundation, or shown the first symptoms, of taste in all the elegant arts of life."

Copybooks are still available for purchase today, but unlike older copybooks many modern ones use print and cursive fonts as the writing examples instead of real handwriting.

Uses
Because in the 18th century good penmanship was primarily considered an important business skill, the copybooks frequently were oriented towards autodidacts wishing to learn business skills, and therefore included chapters on general business management as well as lessons in accounting. Other copybooks, however, focused chiefly on writing literacy and used maxims and sometimes Bible verses as their material. It was intended that students memorize not only correct penmanship, but correct morals as well, through exposure to traditional sayings.

Copybooks were also published in geography, the student being asked to copy first names onto an unlabelled map, and later whole maps onto a latitude/longitude grid.

There are also botanical copybooks like Studies of Flowers from Nature that were popular in the 19th century for developing watercolor painting skills. Here the student would paint an image for which the outline was already drawn in (like a modern coloring book), using as a model a finished watercolor provided by the book's illustrator.

In popular culture
Rudyard Kipling published a poem called The Gods of the Copybook Headings in October 1919, a lesson to keep to common sense.

See also
 Notebook
 Exercise book
 Examination book
 Laboratory notebook

References

Further reading
 American Penmanship, 1800-1850: A history of writing and a bibliography of copybooks from Jenkins to Spencer. American Antiquarian Society. 1969.

External links
 European Network of Forensic Science Institutes - Copybook models and handwriting samples database 
 Historic copybook: Nathan Loomis' Copy Book 

Educational materials
Teaching